Wheelslip may refer to:

 Locomotive wheelslip, railways
 Wheelspin, road vehicles
 Wheelspin (video game), known as SpeedZone in the United States, a futuristic racing video game for Wii